Kigazy (Qıyğaźı) is a rural locality (a selo) in Petropavlovsky Selsoviet, Askinsky District, Bashkortostan, Russia. The population was 468 as of 2010. There are 11 streets.

Geography 
Kigazy is located 17 km southwest of Askino (the district's administrative centre) by road. Davlyatovka is the nearest rural locality.

References 

Rural localities in Askinsky District